Bahai Centre is a suburb of Honiara, Solomon Islands and is located west of Kukum.

References

Populated places in Guadalcanal Province
Suburbs of Honiara